Events during the year 2021 in Bhutan.

Incumbents 

 Monarch: Jigme Khesar Namgyel Wangchuck
 Prime Minister: Lotay Tshering

Events 

 8 January - Bhutan reports its first death from COVID-19 after a 34-year-old man with chronic liver disease and renal failure, who tested positive for COVID-19, died in a hospital in Thimphu.
 20 January - India begins exporting the Oxford–AstraZeneca COVID-19 vaccine to Bhutan.
 27 March - Bhutan launches their largest vaccination campaign against COVID-19 using the Oxford-AstraZeneca vaccine that was received from India.
 24 December - Bhutan begins administering booster doses of the COVID-19 vaccine for people over the age of 65 years, overseas travellers, healthcare workers, people with underlying health conditions, and adults living in high risk areas.

References 

2021 in Asia
Bhutan
2020s in Bhutan
Years of the 21st century in Bhutan